Alma Nungarrayi Granites (1955-2017), a Warlpiri woman, was an Australian artist. She lived at Yuendumu, and was known for painting Yanjirlpirri, Star Dreaming.

Works
Her works are held in the collections of Artbank (Untitled), the Holmes à Court Gallery (Yanjirlpirri or Napaljarri-warnu Jukurrpa diptych, and Yanjirlpirri or Napaljarri-warnu Jukurrpa), the San Antonio Museum of Art (Yanjirlpirri Jukurrpa), and the Australian Museum.

Exhibitions
Granites' work has been exhibited at the Holmes à Court Gallery (Stardust Memories, group), and the San Antonio Museum of Art (Of Country and Culture: The Lam Collection of Contemporary Australian Aboriginal Art, group).

See also
Pleiades in folklore and literature#Australia

Notes

References

Warlpiri people
21st-century Australian painters
21st-century Australian women artists

Artists from the Northern Territory

Australian women painters
Australian Aboriginal artists
1955 births
2017 deaths